In enzymology, a nicotianamine aminotransferase is an enzyme that catalyzes the chemical reaction

nicotianamine + 2-oxoglutarate  3"-deamino-3"-oxonicotianamine + L-glutamate

Thus, the two substrates of this enzyme are nicotianamine and 2-oxoglutarate, whereas its two products are 3-deamino-3-oxonicotianamine and L-glutamate.

This enzyme belongs to the family of transferases, specifically the transaminases, which transfer nitrogenous groups.  The systematic name of this enzyme class is nicotianamine:2-oxoglutarate aminotransferase; nicotianamine transaminase. Other names in common use include NAAT, NAAT-I, NAAT-II, and NAAT-III.

References

 
 
 

EC 2.6.1
Enzymes of unknown structure